Grays Peak National Recreation Trail or Grays Peak Trail lies along the Continental Divide of the Americas, part of the Rocky Mountains in the U.S. state of Colorado.  It is located in the White River National Forest, Summit County.   Grays Peak Trail is south of Interstate 70, east of Keystone Resort and near Montezuma. Grays Peak is adjacent to Torreys Peak.
The Grays Peak Trail begins 3 miles above Interstate 70, at 11,200 feet. The summit of Grays Peak is 3.7 miles from the trailhead.  Torreys Peak is 4.15 miles from the trailhead, across a saddle from Grays Peak.  Grays Peak Trail ascends south through the wetland willows of Stevens Gulch.  The trail passes between Stevens Mine on a lower slope of McClellan Mountain, 13,587 feet, forming the eastern wall of the valley, and Sterling Silver Group Mine beside the trail to the right on Kelso Mountain, 13,164 feet. The trail climbs 900 feet during the first 1.7 miles to a National Recreation Trail sign indicating that the summit is two miles farther.

From the saddle between Grays and Torreys, Stevens Gulch is within sight. The Keystone Resort slopes of Keystone Mountain, 11,641 feet, North Peak, 11,661, and South Peak, 11,982, are west of Grays Peak. Grays Peak, 14,270 feet, and Mount Edwards, 13,850 feet, form the ridge that is the Continental Divide of the Americas east of Torreys Peak.

Wildlife in the area includes mountain goat, pika, cougar or mountain lion, mule deer, elk, marmot, coyote, ptarmigan, American red squirrel, and Canada jay.  Wildflowers that bloom in the tundra area on the Continental Divide include moss campion (Silene acaulis), alpine forget-me-not (Myosotis alpestris), sky pilot (Polemonium viscosum), sea pink, old-man-of-the-mountain (Rydbergia grandiflora), and mountain gentian (Gentiana).  In the Deer Creek Valley, below the tree-line, the blooms of monkshood or wolfsbane, blue columbine, fireweed, and paintbrush (Castilleja) can be found.

References

External links 
Extensive information on hiking Grays Peak Trail(East Slopes) at 14ers.com
Gray Peak Trail at Summitpost.org

Transportation in Clear Creek County, Colorado
Protected areas of Clear Creek County, Colorado
Hiking trails in Colorado
White River National Forest
National Recreation Trails in Colorado